Casey Grice (born October 16, 1991) is an American professional golfer currently playing on the LPGA Tour.

High school career
Grice was Texas 5A state champion in 2008 and runner-up in 2010.

College career
For the North Carolina Tar Heels, she was an Honorable Mention All-American.

Professional career
Grice played the 2014 and 2015 seasons on the Symetra Tour with one appearance on the LPGA Tour. Her finish on the money list of the 2015 Symetra Tour was high enough to earn a card for the 2016 LPGA Tour.

References

External links

American female golfers
North Carolina Tar Heels women's golfers
LPGA Tour golfers
Golfers from Texas
People from College Station, Texas
1991 births
Living people